The 2017 Holy Cross Crusaders football team represented the College of the Holy Cross as a member of the Patriot League during the 2017 NCAA Division I FCS football season. Holy Cross was led by 14th-year head coach Tom Gilmore for the first seven games of the season before he was fired following a 2–5 start. Offensive coordinator Brian Rock was named interim head coach for the final four games. The team finished the season with an overall record of 4–7 and a mark of 3–3 in Patriot League play to place three-way tie for third. The Crusaders played their home games at Fitton Field in Worcester, Massachusetts.

Schedule
The 2017 schedule consisted of five home and six away games. The Crusaders hosted Patriot League foes Lafayette, Colgate, and Georgetown. They traveled to Bucknell, Fordham, and Lehigh.

In 2017, Holy Cross played non-conference opponents UConn of the American Athletic Conference, New Hampshire of the Colonial Athletic Association, Dartmouth and Yale of the Ivy League, and Monmouth of the Big South Conference.

Game summaries

at UConn

at Bucknell

New Hampshire

at Dartmouth

Lafayette

Monmouth

at Yale

Colgate

Georgetown

at Fordham

at Lehigh

Ranking movements

References

Holy Cross
Holy Cross Crusaders football seasons
Holy Cross Crusaders football